Cavedweller is a 2004 American drama film directed by Lisa Cholodenko, based on the novel of the same name by Dorothy Allison. It stars Kyra Sedgwick and Aidan Quinn. It won the New American Cinema award at the 30th Seattle International Film Festival.

Plot summary
A traumatic event sends a musician (Sedgwick) back to her hometown in an effort to reunite with the two daughters she abandoned. To do so, she must confront her abusive ex-husband (Quinn), from whom she fled years ago.  He is all alone dying of cancer.

Delia ran away after her husband tried to kill her.  She joined a rock band and had a daughter Cissy with Randall (Bacon).  Randall dies in LA and Delia decides after a ten year absence to return home to Georgia.  Delia is not welcome home and her small town is unforgiving.  Grandma Windsor has raised Amanda aged 16, a born again Christian, and Dede aged 14, a free spirited singer like her mother.  Grandma will not let Delia see her children.

Former husband Clint wants to die at home and Delia agrees to be his caretaker if the two daughters are returned to her custody.
Dying Clint, redemption seeking Delia, uprooted daughter Cissy and the bitter daughters Amanda and Dede all live together.  Delia assures that this time she will not run away again.  Cissy grew up in LA and southern rural Georgia is a hard adjustment.  She cares for and bonds to Clint.  Amanda wants Mom to become a born again Christian and find God's forgiveness.  Delia wants her daughter to forgive and love her not God.  Dede smokes and has a secret boyfriend and might understand why her mother left.

Clint dies at home.  Despite the raw emotions and new relationships, there is hope for this family.

Cast
Kyra Sedgwick as Delia Byrd
Aidan Quinn as Clint Windsor
Sherilyn Fenn as MT
Kevin Bacon as Randall Pritchard
Jill Scott as Rosemary
Vanessa Zima as Amanda Windsor
April Mullen as Dede
Regan Arnold as Cissy Pritchard

Reception
Josh Ralske of AllMusic gave Cavedweller 3 stars out of 5, calling it "a potent, absorbing family drama that ends on a note of real emotional power." Matthew Gilbert of The Boston Globe said, "[Kyra] Sedgwick is marvelous, and so are all three of the actresses who play her daughters, particularly Regan Arnold as Cissy."

Meanwhile, David Rooney of Variety said, "screenwriter Anne Meredith's adaptation too often skims the surface of the characters' struggles when it should dig deeper, sacrificing much of the novel's emotional resonance in the distillation, particularly where Cissy is concerned."

Robert Lloyd of Los Angeles Times praised cinematographer Xavier Perez Grobet's work. He said, "[Grobet] seems to have thumbed through some American photography collections in preparation for this shoot -- I thought of William Eggleston and Stephen Shore -- and does marvelous things with light."

References

External links

2004 films
American drama films
Films directed by Lisa Cholodenko
2004 independent films
Films based on American novels
2000s English-language films
2000s American films